Svetlana Zainetdinova (born 19 October 1962 in Ufa) is an Estonian chess player who holds the FIDE title of Woman FIDE Master (WFM, 2006) and ICCF title of Lady Grandmaster (LGM, 2009).

Biography
In 1979, Svetlana Zainetdinova graduated from secondary school in Ufa. She started play chess in Ufa's Pioneers Palace. In 1984, Svetlana Zainetdinova has graduated from the Russian Institute of Physical Culture and works as a trainer.

Since 1984 she has been working as a chess coach in Kohtla-Järve, and since 2002 she is a member of board in the local chess club "Diagonal".

In Estonian Women's Chess Championship Svetlana Zainetdinova has won  gold (1985) and silver medals (2000).
She is an excellent correspondence chess player who holds the titles of Lady International Correspondence Chess Master (LIM, 2006), Lady International Correspondence Chess Grand Master (LGM, 2009), International Correspondence Chess Master (IM, 2009).

References

External links
 
 
 

1962 births
Living people
Estonian female chess players
Soviet female chess players
Chess Woman FIDE Masters
Sportspeople from Ufa
Sportspeople from Kohtla-Järve
Estonian people of Russian descent